Banuj (also Romanized as Bānūj; also known as Banūch and Bāynūj) is a village in Hashivar Rural District, in the Central District of Darab County, Fars Province, Iran. At the 2006 census, its population was 2,402, in 596 families.

References 

Populated places in Darab County